Max McFarland (born 13 July 1993) is a Scotland 7s international rugby union player who currently plays as a wing for the Glasgow Warriors team. McFarland was born in Ireland, and qualifies to play for Scotland through his Glaswegian grandfather.

Early life
McFarland attended Clongowes Wood College, a secondary boarding school known for producing good rugby players.
Before turning professional, McFarland played for the Edinburgh teams Boroughmuir RFC and Watsonians RFC.

Professional career

McFarland was in the Leinster Rugby Academy squad, before moving to Edinburgh Rugby in 2014. He played for the squad for the start of season 2016–17. In 2017–18 McFarland spent the pre-season with Munster Rugby.
On 21 November 2017, he signed for Glasgow Warriors in a partnership deal to the end of the 2017–18 season.

International career

McFarland qualifies to play for Scotland through his grandfather who was born in Glasgow. McFarland was called up to the Scotland 7s squad for the 2014 Sevens Grand Prix Series in Manchester.

References

1993 births
Living people
Scottish rugby union players
Glasgow Warriors players
Scotland international rugby sevens players
Male rugby sevens players
Watsonians RFC players
Boroughmuir RFC players
Clontarf FC players
Leinster Rugby players
Munster Rugby players
Edinburgh Rugby players
Rugby sevens players at the 2020 Summer Olympics
Olympic rugby sevens players of Great Britain